John Kelsey is an American artist, writer and art dealer. Since 1999, he has been a member of the artist collective Bernadette Corporation. In 2004, he co-founded Reena Spaulings Fine Art with Emily Sundblad. The gallery was named after Bernadette Corporation's novel of the same name.

Publications
 John Kelsey. 2010. Rich texts: selected writing for art. Berlin: Sternberg Press.

References

Living people
American art critics
American artists
American art curators
Year of birth missing (living people)